Eskandar Azmoudeh (17 March 1912 – 6 July 1998) was a Lieutenant-general and one of the senior Iranian soldiers in the Pahlavi period

Life 
He was born in 1912 in Tehran. Like his older brother, Amir Hossein Azmoudeh, he served in the military and graduated from the Tehran Officer College, then went on to study in Europe and the United States, where he underwent military tactics. Azmoudeh gained many positions in the army, including Deputy Commander-in-Chief Army

Iran's Deputy Military Assistant in the United Kingdom, Army Command in Persia and Azerbaijan, Head of the Army Procurement Department, Deputy Commander of the Land Forces of the Imperial Army. During the failed coup d'état of August 16 and the successful coup d'état of August 19, 1953 against the government of Mohammad Mosaddegh, Azmoudeh was one of the officers who liaised with MI6 and CIA agents and commanded part of the operation against Mossadegh's government.

He was in charge of the Pahlavi War and was responsible for occupying the Bazaar Telephone Center and the south of the city and the center of Ekbatan. He carried out his mission on August 15, 1953, but knowing that the coup plan had failed, he re-launched the Bazaar Call Center so that his regiment would not be in danger. With the defeat of the coup, many officers were arrested, including Azmoudeh.

After the successful of the coup d'état on August 19, 1953, these officers were released and on the day of Mohammad Reza Pahlavi's arrival in the country, all the officers in charge of the coup d'état were promoted to the rank of colonel. He was then assigned to command the Ishratabad Brigade and Barracks. Azmoudeh retired after being promoted to the rank of lieutenant general, and in 1968, Jamshid Amouzegar, Minister of Finance of Hoveyda's government, who was a close relative of his, became the Deputy Minister of Finance and Director General of Customs. General Azmoudeh remained in this position until 1974, when this year his relative Jamshid Amouzegar, the Minister of Interior, once again appointed him governor of East Azerbaijan.

With the beginning of the Islamic Revolution, on February 20, 1978, huge demonstrations were held in Tabriz in opposition to the Pahlavi regime, which ended with the killing of people. The governor of the time was recognized as the direct person in charge of the Tabriz event Azmoudeh. For this reason, in order to extinguish the flames of dissatisfaction and calm down the people of Tabriz, on February 22, 1978, Azmoudeh was summoned to Tehran and fired. After a while, he left for England and died in 1998 in London.

Sources 

 Taken from the Institute of Contemporary Iranian History Studies

1912 births
1998 deaths
Imperial Iranian Army lieutenant generals
Governors of East Azerbaijan Province